Buffalo Lake Metis Settlement is a Metis settlement in northern Alberta, Canada within Smoky Lake County.

Demographics 

The population of the Buffalo Lake Metis Settlement according to its 2018 municipal census is 702, an increase from its 2015 municipal census population count of 676.

See also 
List of communities in Alberta
List of designated places in Alberta

References

External links 

Métis settlements in Alberta
Designated places in Alberta
Smoky Lake County